Lepus is a genus of mammals in the Leporidae family.

Lepus may also be:
 Lepus (constellation), a group of stars
 Arieșeni, a commune in Romania
 Lepus-the story of a hare, a book by D.Brian Plummer
 Night of the Lepus, a horror film